The Jaguar Kensington is a concept car designed and built by Italdesign for Jaguar. It debuted as a non-running, full-size mock up at the 1990 Geneva Motor Show, and later as a fully functioning prototype at the 1990 British International Motor Show.

History 
The Kensington was designed by Italdesign as a possible successor to the then current Jaguar XJ. It featured a sleeker design and swoopy roofline, with the intention by Giugiaro being to move away from the XJ's conventional three box design and update it for the 1990s. Jaguar did not end up putting the Kensington into production, and later the design was adapted by Italdesign for the smaller, front wheel drive Daewoo Leganza. Some reviewers have theorized that the first generation Lexus GS, also designed by Italdesign, was also an evolution of the Kensington's design, but Italdesign clarified that the GS concept was developed in 1988, long before the Kensington.

Specifications 
Power is sent to the rear wheels through a GM 3-speed automatic transmission. The wheelbase of the XJ12 was left unchanged but the new body featured a  longer front overhang,  shorter rear overhang and a  higher roof.

References 

Jaguar concept vehicles
Italdesign concept vehicles